Keine ruhige Minute is the ninth album by the singer-songwriter Reinhard Mey. All songs were written by Mey.

Track listing
 Happy birthday to me 5: 12
 Dieter Malinek, Ulla und ich 3: 51
 Dr. Nahtlos, Dr. Sägeberg und Dr. Hein 4: 45
 Von Kammerjägern, Klarsichthüllen, von dir und mir 2: 30
 Zeugnistag 4: 20
 Alles ist gut 3: 33
 Keine ruhige Minute 2: 26
 Erinnerungen 3: 23
 Daddy Blue 5: 05
 Von Luftschlössern, die zerbrochen sind 3: 20
 Was weiss ich schon von dir? 3: 10
 Ab heut' und ab hier 3: 00

1979 albums
Reinhard Mey albums
Intercord albums